Charles Emmerson (born 1976) is a British-Australian historian. He was born in Melbourne and grew up in London. He studied Modern History at Oxford University, and pursued postgraduate studies at the Institut d'Etudes Politiques in Paris. He has worked for the International Crisis Group, the World Economic Forum, the Financial Times, and Chatham House, where he is currently a senior research fellow. He has written two well-received books: The Future History of the Arctic (2010) and 1913: The World Before the Great War (2013). Emmerson has also contributed to programmes on BBC Radio 3.

He lives in London.

References

1976 births
Australian historians
People from Melbourne
Living people
Chatham House people